Animal Dance is an album by American pianist and composer John Lewis and German trombonist Albert Mangelsdorff (with The Zagreb Jazz Quartet contributing one track) which was recorded in West Germany for the Atlantic label in 1962.

Reception

Ken Dryden in his review for AllMusic states: "none of the musicians had ever played together, though it made little difference as they quickly absorbed the originals of Lewis and Mangelsdorff, along with the familiar standard 'Autumn Leaves' (a trio arrangement omitting Lewis) and Gary McFarland's 'Why Are You Blue'.".

Track listing
All compositions by John Lewis, except as indicated
 "Animal Dance" – 2:39
 "Autumn Leaves" (Joseph Kosma, Johnny Mercer, Jacques Prévert) – 6:41
 "Set 'Em Up" (Albert Mangelsdorff) – 3:18
 "Monday in Milan" – 5:25
 "The Sheriff" – 3:52
 "Why Are You Blue?" (Gary McFarland) – 6:30
 "Ornaments" (Davor Kajfes) – 6:34

Personnel 
Tracks 1–6:
John Lewis – piano (tracks 1 & 3–6)
Albert Mangelsdorff – trombone
Karl-Theodor Geier – bass 
Silvije Glojnaric – drums 
Track 7:
Bosko Petrovic – vibraphone
Davor Kajfes – piano
Miljenko Prohaska – bass
Silvije Glojnaric – drums

References 

 

1964 albums
John Lewis (pianist) albums
Albert Mangelsdorff albums
Atlantic Records albums